Kristin Chenoweth in Concert was the debut concert tour by American actress and singer Kristin Chenoweth. The tour promoted her fourth studio album, Some Lessons Learned (2011). The tour predominantly visited the United States, with a few shows in Australia.

Background
The tour was announced in February 2012 on Chenoweth's official website. While the singer had done spot shows in Los Angeles and New York City, this marked her first concert tour. In an interview with The Baltimore Sun, she stated that touring was new territory despite her Broadway background. Wanting to incorporate her new album and elements of the stage, Chenoweth stated that the show would not be "boring":, "The tour is not just a stand-and-sing affair. There's a cast. There's movement and acting. It's very well-crafted, a very full evening."

Due to a tracheal infection, Chenoweth had to reschedule shows in Chicago, Minneapolis, and Nashville. In August 2012, she suffered a head injury while filming The Good Wife. While recovering, dates in Europe and Australia were rescheduled to 2013. The rescheduled UK shows were canceled at the last minute, citing inadequate funding from the promoter, Speckulation Entertainment, as the reason.

Concert synopsis
The concert was directed by Richard Jay-Alexander and accompanied by a small orchestra conducted by Mary-Mitchell Campbell. Chenoweth performed a diverse selection of songs with which she has been associated, including hits from her musicals, along with original songs from Some Lessons Learned and some of her previous solo albums, and a few of her other favorite songs.

Setlist 
The following setlist was obtained from the concert held on November 5, 2012, at the Segerstrom Concert Hall in Costa Mesa, California. It does not represent all concerts for the duration of the tour. 
"Should I Be Be Sweet" from Take a Chance
"Goin' to the Dance with You"
"Maybe This Time"
"My Coloring Book"
"Hard Times Come Again No More"
"One Less Bell to Answer" / "A House Is Not a Home"
"Fathers and Daughters" by Jodi Marr and Tom Douglas
"Upon This Rock" by Gloria Gaither
"Bring Him Home"
"In These Shoes?"
"Popular"
"For Good"
"What Would Dolly Do" by Chenoweth, Desmond Child, Shane McAnally, and Bob Ezrin
"Wishing You Were Somehow Here Again"
"What If We Never" by Dianne Warren
"I'm Tired"
"No More Tears (Enough Is Enough)"
"All the Things You Are"
"I Was Here" by Victoria Shaw, Gary Burr, and Hillary Scott
Encore
"I Will Always Love You"

Tour dates

Festivals and other miscellaneous performances
This concert was a part of the Adelaide Cabaret Festival

Cancellations and rescheduled shows

Box office score data

References

2012 concert tours
2013 concert tours
Concert tours of Canada
Concert tours of North America
Concert tours of the United States